The  or  (same meaning) is a kind of supernatural fire that appears in the Edo period bestiary Ehon Hyaku Monogatari.

Summary 
The rōjinbi is a demonic flame that supposedly appears deep in the mountains on rainy nights on the boundary of Shinano Province (now Nagano Prefecture) and Tōtōmi Province (now Shizuoka Prefecture). It is said to appear along with an elderly person, and cannot be extinguished by water but can be if beat with animal skins.

If, for instance, one comes across a rōjinbi on a straight stretch of road, holding one's footwear over one's head will prompt it to veer off to another path. However, if the person panics and tries to run away, it will apparently pursue them indefinitely.

It is sometimes called , but this actually means an onibi that a tengu has lit.

, by the late Edo period scholar Hirata Atsutane with the aid of a boy who apparently returned home safely after being abducted by tengu, claims that tengu eat fish and birds, but not other animals. The priest was assumed to be a tengu, and the tengu trait of hating beasts and meat as described in Senkyō ibun and Heisuiroku has been pointed out as being related to the rumour that rōjinbi can be put out with animal skins.

See also 
 List of legendary creatures from Japan

References

Bibliography 
 Tada, Katsumi (1997). Takehara Shunsen ehon hyakumonogatari tōsanjin yawa. Kokushokankokai. .

Atmospheric ghost lights